The 39th National Television Festival (Vietnamese: Liên hoan truyền hình toàn quốc lần thứ 39) was held from December 11 to December 14, 2019, in Nha Trang City, Khánh Hòa Province. It reviewed and honoured best works of Vietnam's television industry in 2019.

Event

Participation
More than 1,200 delegates from Radio - Television stations and television channels throughout the country attended the Festival. There are 464 works by authors and groups of authors. In which, the reportage genre attracted the most participating works with nearly 150 works. The documentary category has more than 80 single-episode documentaries and six multi-episodes documentaries submitted for competition. In general, the number of entries was less than in the previous year, but the quality increased markedly in many genres.

Activities
The 39th National Television Festival is organized by Vietnam Television in collaboration with Khanh Hoa Radio and Television Station (KTV). This is the 4th time KTV has hosted the Festival, the biggest event of the year for Vietnamese broadcasters. Many activities took place at the festival:

 The opening ceremony took place at 20:10 on December 11, at the Convention Center of Khanh Hoa province, broadcast live on channel VTV1
 Workshop: Producing news on the Internet environment (Vietnamese: "Sản xuất tin tức trên môi trường Internet"), with the participation of foreign speakers
 Workshop: Investigative reportage on television (Vietnamese: "Phóng sự điều tra trên truyền hình")
 Photo exhibition: Broadcasters (Vietnamese: Những người làm truyền hình"). It's about the activities of the national television industry
 The closing and awarding ceremony took place at 8 pm on December 14, broadcast live on KTV and replayed at 3 pm on December 15 on VTV1

Awards
After 4 working days, 9 judges in 9 categories awarded a total of: 1 Grand Prize, 30 Gold Prizes, 54 Silver Prizes, 126 Certificates of Merit. For the first time since 2016, a Grand Prize, which is higher than the Gold Prize, was awarded by the Festival. It was given to the drama Come Home, My Dear produced by VTV Film Center (VFC), thanks to its great effects and influence on the national audience during the year.

In addition, the jury awarded 3 individual awards in the Drama category and 1 other individual award in the Television Theater category.

The list below doesn't include the works received Certificate of Merit:
Highlighted title indicates Grand Prize
The double-dagger indicates Short Drama or Multi-episodes Documentary
Serial Drama and Single-episode Documentary are shown without any dagger icon

Grand & Gold Prize

Silver Prize

See also
 2019 Kite Awards
 2019 VTV Awards
 21st Vietnam Film Festival

References

National Television Festival of Vietnam
2019 in Vietnam
2019 in Vietnamese television